Višnja Mosić (1870 - 13 September 1937) was a Serbian war heroine during the First World War. For approximately ten years before the Assassination of Archduke Franz Ferdinand of Austria and the subsequent outbreak of World War I, she had been a member of the Young Bosnia organization.

Biography

Višnja Đurić was born in 1870 in the village of Gornje Dubovo. In the years before World War I, Mosić, became a member of Mlada Bosna, a revolutionary youth organization, which fought against the Austro-Hungarian occupation of Bosnia and Herzegovina and for unification with Serbia and other south Slavic countries. She performed the important role of carrying oral and written messages between the members of the organization and the National Defense organization in Serbia. She would often cross the border, unseen by the Austro-Hungarian army, by pretending to be taking her sheep out to pasture along the border. If she happened to be stopped by the military, she would put the written messages under her tongue and feign toothache or pretend she was deaf-mute. She would sometimes use her daughter Cvijeta and hide the messages in her hair plaits. On other occasions, she would sew the notes into the woolen clothes she wore. Following the Sarajevo assassination of Crown Prince Franz Ferdinand, Mosić was arrested and taken to prison in Sarajevo, where she spent two years, after which she was transferred to Vienna. In the trial that took place, she pretended she was feeble-minded and was released. She died on 13 September 1937.

References

1870 births
1937 deaths
People from Višegrad
Serbian women in World War I
Young Bosnia